The 2015 Nigerian Senate election in Akwa Ibom State was held on March 28, 2015, to elect members of the Nigerian Senate to represent Akwa Ibom State. Bassey Albert representing Akwa Ibom North East, Godswill Akpabio representing Akwa Ibom North West and Nelson Effiong representing Akwa Ibom South all won on the platform of Peoples Democratic Party.

Overview

Summary

Results

Akwa Ibom North East 
Peoples Democratic Party candidate Bassey Albert won the election, defeating All Progressives Congress candidate Emmanuel Obot and other party candidates.

Akwa Ibom North West 
Peoples Democratic Party candidate Godswill Akpabio won the election, defeating All Progressives Congress candidate Inibehe Okori and other party candidates.

Akwa Ibom South 
Peoples Democratic Party candidate Nelson Effiong won the election, defeating All Progressives Congress candidate Bassey Etienam and other party candidates.

References 

Akwa Ibom State Senate elections
March 2015 events in Nigeria
Akw